Sergey Solovyov (born 1955) is a Russian mathematician, Dr.Sc., Professor, a professor at the Faculty of Computer Science at the Moscow State University.

He graduated from the faculty MSU CMC (1977).

He defended the thesis «Mathematical methods and principles of building automated knowledge engineering systems» for the degree of Doctor of Physical and Mathematical Sciences (1996).

Was awarded the title of Professor (2003).

Area of scientific interests: information systems. Project Manager Glossary . Author of more than 70 scientific works on formal grammars, expert systems, experimental data processing systems and network technologies.

References

Literature

External links
 
 Scientific works of Sergey Solovyov
 Scientific works of Sergey Solovyov

Russian computer scientists
Russian mathematicians
Living people
1955 births
Moscow State University alumni